Horse mussel or horsemussel may refer to:
Atrina squamifera
Atrina zelandica
Modiolus modiolus 
 any species in the genus Modiolus

Animal common name disambiguation pages